William Alfred Quayle (25 June 1860 – 9 March 1925) was an American Bishop of the Methodist Episcopal Church, elected in 1908.

Birth and family
William was born 25 June 1860 in Parkville, Missouri, the son of Thomas and Elizabeth (Gayle) Quayle. William married Allie Hancock Davis 28 January 1886.  They had a son, William R. Quayle, and a daughter, Allie Gayle Quayle (who predeceased him).

William Alfred Quayle died at his home in Baldwin, Kansas on 9 March 1925.

Education
William earned the A.B. degree (1885) and the A.M. degree (1888) from Baker University.  He then earned the PhD degree (1892) from Allegheny College.

Ordained and academic ministry
William served as a Tutor at Baker University (1883–84), then as an Adjunct Professor of ancient languages (1885).  He was ordained to the ministry of the M.E. Church in 1886.  He then received the appointment of Professor of Greek Language (1887–90), and as President of Baker University (1890–94).

The Rev. Dr. Quayle was appointed Pastor of an M.E. Church in Kansas City, Missouri in 1894.  He was appointed to Indianapolis, Indiana in 1897.  He was sent back to Kansas City, MO in 1900.  He then was appointed Pastor of the St. James M.E. Church in Chicago in 1904, serving there until his election to the episcopacy.

The Rev. Dr. Quayle was elected a delegate to M.E. General Conferences in 1896 and 1908.  He was also a Fraternal Delegate to the English Wesleyan Church in 1902.

Episcopal ministry
The Rev. Dr. Quayle was elected to the episcopacy of the M.E. Church by the 1908 General Conference.  He was assigned to Oklahoma City, Oklahoma as his Episcopal Residence.  He also served St. Paul, Minnesota.

As a Bishop he attended the Ecumenical Conference of 1911.  He also was a member of the Joint Hymnal Revision Committee of American Methodism.

Honorary degrees
The Rev. William Alfred Quayle was honored by his alma mater, Baker University, with the degrees Litt.D. in 1900 and LL.D. in 1908.  DePauw University awarded the degree Doctor of Divinity in 1892.  Lawrence College also awarded the LL.D. in 1908.

Selected writings
Poet's Poet and Other Essays, The Methodist Book Concern, 1897.
Study in Current Social Theories, The Methodist Book Concern, 1898.
A Hero and Some Other Folk, The Methodist Book Concern, 1899.
Blessed Life, The Methodist Book Concern, 1900.
Books and Life, The Methodist Book Concern, 1901.
Pastor-Preacher, The Methodist Book Concern, 1901.
In God's Out-of-Doors, The Methodist Book Concern, 1902.
Laymen in Action, The Methodist Book Concern, 1902.
Eternity in the Heart, The Methodist Book Concern, 1904.
Prairie and the Sea, The Methodist Book Concern, 1905.
Lowell and the Christian Faith, The Methodist Book Concern, 1906.
God's Calendar, The Methodist Book Concern, 1907.
Book of Ruth, Dodge Publishing Company, 1909.
Song of Songs, The Methodist Book Concern, 1910.
Climb to God, The Methodist Book Concern, 1912.
Beside Lake Beautiful, The Methodist Book Concern, 1914.
Poems, The Methodist Book Concern, 1914.
The Healing Shadow, The Abingdon Press, 1923.
A Book of Clouds, The Abingdon Press, (1925).

See also

 List of bishops of the United Methodist Church

References

 Leete, Frederick DeLand, Methodist Bishops.  Nashville, The Methodist Publishing House, 1948.
 Price, Carl F., Compiler and Editor:  Who's Who in American Methodism, New York:  E.B. Treat & Co., 1916.

External links
 
 
 Works by William A. Quayle at The Online Books Page

1860 births
1925 deaths
Allegheny College alumni
American Methodist Episcopal bishops
19th-century American poets
American male poets
Baker University alumni
American biblical scholars
Methodist writers
20th-century American poets
20th-century American biographers
19th-century American male writers
People from Parkville, Missouri
20th-century American male writers
American male biographers